Prunin is a flavanone glycoside found in immature citrus fruits and in tomatoes. Its aglycone form is called naringenin.

Metabolism 
Alpha-L-rhamnosidase breaks naringin into prunin and rhamnose. Glucosidase breaks prunin into glucose and naringenin.

References

Bibliography

External links

Flavanone glycosides
Flavonoid glucosides